Madison Lake Dam is a dam located on Deer Creek, about  east of London in Madison County, Ohio, at .

Madison Lake Dam was originally planned out when a piece of land was donated to the state on which to build a lake.  The Ohio Division of Conservation built a dam across Deer Creek, and the lake was filled by 1947.  In 1950, the newly created Ohio Department of Natural Resources took over the site, and it has since become part of the Madison Lake State Park.

References

Dams completed in 1946
Dams in Ohio